Hawija District is a district in Kirkuk Governorate, Iraq. Its administrative center is the city of Hawija.

The district's approximately 150,000 inhabitants are mostly Sunni Arabs, with the rest being Shia Turkmens and Kaka'i Kurds. Most of the inhabitants live in rural areas.

Towns and villages
Hawija
Al-Zab
Al-Abbasi
Riyad
Al-Rashad
Sudayrah

References

Districts of Kirkuk Province